Clifton is an unincorporated community in Schuyler County, in the U.S. state of Missouri.

History
A post office called Clifton was established in 1865, and remained in operation until 1904. The community most likely has the name of a local family. The area was sometimes called "Germania".

References

Unincorporated communities in Schuyler County, Missouri
Unincorporated communities in Missouri